Ira Kaplan (born January 7, 1957) is a co-founder, vocalist, guitarist and songwriter in the American indie rock band Yo La Tengo. He is married to the band's co-founder Georgia Hubley.

A graduate of Sarah Lawrence College, Kaplan formed Yo La Tengo in the early 1980s.  Previously, he worked as a music critic for the SoHo Weekly News, New York Rocker and Village Voice, as well as serving as a soundman, roadie and backup musician for Mofungo and other New York-area bands. Kaplan's life, family, and musical development were chronicled in the book Big Day Coming: Yo La Tengo and the Rise of Indie Rock, by Jesse Jarnow (Avery Books, 2012).

In 2012, Spin Magazine named Kaplan the 97th greatest guitarist of all time.

Kaplan's vocals were featured in Eluvium's 2013 album Nightmare Ending in the song "Happiness". He occasionally hosts a free-form radio program on WFMU under the name "Ira the K."

References

External links 

 Official Yo La Tengo site
 Matador Records' official Yo La Tengo site

American rock guitarists
American male guitarists
1957 births
Living people
Sarah Lawrence College alumni
American indie rock musicians
Jewish American musicians
Yo La Tengo members
American radio DJs
Jewish rock musicians
20th-century American guitarists